Luciano Rezzolla (born 1967) is an Italian professor of relativistic  astrophysics and
numerical relativity at the Goethe University Frankfurt. His main field of study is the physics and astrophysics of compact objects such as black holes and neutron stars. It was announced in 2019 that he had been appointed honorary Andrews Professor of Astronomy at Trinity College Dublin (TCD).

Education 
Born in Milan, Italy, in 1967, Rezzolla completed his undergraduate degree in physics 
at the University of Bari and University of Trieste. After a year in the Italian Navy as submarine officer, he studied at  SISSA and received his PhD in 1997 under the supervision of John C. Miller.

Academic career
After completing a postdoc at the University of Illinois at Urbana–Champaign studying black holes and neutron stars, he returned to SISSA as a research fellow, and ultimately an associate professor. In 2006 he became head of the numerical relativity group at the Max Planck Institute for Gravitational Physics in Potsdam, Germany specialising in the numerical simulations of binary black holes and binary neutron stars. In 2013, he moved to Goethe University to fill the chair of theoretical astrophysics. Since 2017, he is the Director of the Institute for Theoretical Physics in Frankfurt.

Together with collaborators in 2001, he has shown that r-modes in a neutron star will generate differential rotation, which could amplify the magnetic field and suppress the instability. In 2003, he proposed that the QPOs that are measured in harmonic ratios in high-mass X-ray binaries can be explained simply in terms of trapped p-mode oscillations of an accretion torus around the black hole. Together with collaborators in 2011, he showed that the merger of magnetised neutron stars leads to the formation of a black hole and highly magnetised torus from which a magnetic jet structure develops which provides a link between the theoretical modelling and observation of a jet in short gamma-ray bursts. In 2013, together with Heino Falcke he has proposed that blitzars could be an explanation
for fast radio bursts. Blitzars would
occur when a supramassive rotating neutron star slows down enough, loses
its magnetic field and then turns into a black hole. He has  also worked on gravastars and found that the merger of black holes from GW150914 is not consistent with the gravastar model.

Alongside Heino Falcke and Michael Kramer, he received a
14 million euro research grant of the European Research Council (Synergy Grant) for further
studies into black holes with the goal to construct a black hole camera using the Event Horizon Telescope (EHT). This would allow testing of general theory of relativity by creating an image of the black hole shadow. Starting from 2015, and as a member of the Executive Board of the collaboration Event Horizon Telescope, he has contributed to the international effort of producing the first image of a supermassive black hole at the center of the supergiant elliptical galaxy Messier 87 (M87). Together with his group in Frankfurt, and using numerical simulations of plasma accreting onto black holes, he has contributed to the theoretical interpretation of the observational data.

His awards include the Karl-Schwarzchild Prize (2017), the Frankfurt Physics Science Prize (2019) the NSF Diamond Achievement Award, the Breakthrough Prize in Fundamental Physics (both in 2019 and shared with EHT Collaboration), and the "Golden Seal" from the University of Bari. He has also been appointed "Outstanding Personality 2019" from Frankfurt am Main City Council (2019). In 2020 he was awarded an Advanced ERC Grant (Jetset) to study the launching and propagation of relativistic jets.

With Olindo Zanotti, he has written a textbook "Relativistic Hydrodynamics", that is universally recognised as the standard reference on this topic.

Public Outreach
Rezzolla has always dedicated his attention to the diffusion of his scientific results, especially through the use of advanced visualisations of his simulations. One simulation on gamma-ray bursts has received more than five hundred thousands views on YouTube, while another simulation on the tidal disruption of neutron stars has also attracted a lot of attention with almost a million views, eventually ending-up on the New York Times.

In 2020 he has published his first public-outreach book "The irresistible attraction of gravity", first appeared in Italian and then in other languages, such as German and English.

Personal life
Rezzolla is an avid sailor and currently lives in Potsdam with his wife, Carolin Schneider, and three children, Anna, Emilia and Dominik.

Bibliography

References

External links
 
 Personal website

1967 births
Italian astrophysicists
Living people